Yershovo is a rural locality (a village) and the administrative center of Yershovskoye Rural Settlement, Sheksninsky District, Vologda Oblast, Russia. The population was 246 as of 2002.

Geography 
Yershovo is located 25 km north of Sheksna (the district's administrative centre) by road. Pogorelka is the nearest rural locality.

References 

Rural localities in Sheksninsky District